Centre In The Square is a live theatre and performing arts centre located on Queen Street in downtown Kitchener, Ontario, Canada.

The centre is home to the Raffi Armenian Theatre. This 2,047 seat hall is the largest in Waterloo Region as well as the main venue for Kitchener-Waterloo Symphony performances. The Studio Theatre is the second performing space inside the building. It is a multipurpose space used for receptions, rehearsals, and intimate cabaret-style performances. Nearly 200,000 patrons visit The Centre annually.

The Kitchener-Waterloo Art Gallery also resides within Centre In The Square and maintains separate administrative offices.

History
The Centre opened in September, 1980 and cost just over $11 million. The building was designed by Kitchener architecture firm Rieder, Hymmen and Lobban and earned international attention for its expansive view and acoustical superiority.

The site was once home to the Emmanuel Bible College.

The Centre In The Square building is owned by the City of Kitchener and operated by a not-for-profit corporation. The centre is currently governed by a 14-member board which includes the Mayor of Kitchener, three city councilors, and eight citizens appointed by city council.

Programming
Regular season programming runs from September to June featuring numerous series. In accordance with the mission statement adopted in 2005, The centre offers a wide range of shows in hopes to provide entertainment for all members of the local community. Series include:
 Broadway
 Comedy
 Songwriters
 Electric Thursdays
 Classic Albums Live
 Canadian Play
 K-W Symphony Signature
 K-W Symphony Pops

Magnetic North Theatre Festival
The annual Magnetic North Theatre Festival was held June 9–19, 2010 in Kitchener-Waterloo. The centre was the main venue for festival performances, hosting Rick Mercer, Norman, and The Greatest Cities in the World.

As part of the festival, Governor General Michaëlle Jean visited Centre In The Square on Monday, June 14, 2010, to host Art Matters, a public forum on the importance of the arts in creating better communities.

Studio Theatre
The smaller performing space in The centre has traditionally been used for K-W Symphony rehearsals and private functions. However, this is set to change by March 2011 as Centre In The Square has received $1.2 million in federal government stimulus funding. The Studio Theatre will be retrofitted into a versatile space for up to 350 patrons.

References

External links

Centre In The Square - Official website

Theatres in Ontario
Theatres completed in 1980
Culture of Kitchener, Ontario
Buildings and structures in Kitchener, Ontario
Tourist attractions in Kitchener, Ontario
1980 establishments in Ontario